ESN Vrilissia or ESN Vrilission is a Handball club that based in Vrilissia, Athens. The full name of club is Ekpolitistikos Syllogos Neon Vrilission  that means Cultural Youth Association Vrilissia. The club was founded in 1979 and has won one Greek Championship and two Cups. In September 2011 the group was withdrawn by the first division championship (A1 Ethniki) because of financial difficulties. In current season the club plays in A2 Ethniki (second division).

Current Seasons

Honours and achievements
Greek Championship
Winner (1): 1996
Greek Cup
Winner (2): 1996, 2011

References

External links

Greek handball clubs
Sports clubs in Athens